The surname Clemons is an Anglo-Saxon name that was originally derived from the given name Clement which means "the son of clement". The name has ancient origins in Latin and applies to a mild or merciful individual. Historically the surname was used by Saxons as they converted to Christianity.

People
 Clarence Clemons (1942–2011), American musician, saxophonist for the E Street Band
 Darius Clemons, basketball player
 Jack Clemons, NASA engineer
 Jane Clemons, U.S. Representative for New Hampshire 
 John Clemons (1862–1944), Australian lawyer and politician
 Kiersey Clemons, American actress
 Kyle Clemons (born 1990), American track and field sprinter
 Micheal Clemons (born 1997), American football player
 Pinball Clemons (born 1965), American–Canadian player and executive in Canadian football
 Sam Clemons (born 1978), American football player
 Tameka A. Clemons, American biochemist

See also
 List of Old English (Anglo-Saxon) surnames
 Clemens (disambiguation)
 Clemons (disambiguation)
 Clemmons (disambiguation)

References
Clemons Family Crest and Name History - House of Names

Surnames from given names